QAnon Anonymous (QAA) is an investigative journalism podcast that analyzes and debunks conspiracy theories. It is co-hosted by Travis View (pen name of Logan Strain), Julian Feeld, and Jake Rockatansky, alongside British correspondent Annie Kelly and Canadian correspondent Liv Agar.

The podcast premiered in August 2018, around 10 months after the first couple of posts made by the person claiming to be 'Q' on the 4chan message board. NPR called QAA "a podcast that tracks and debunks online conspiracy theories", initially focusing on the QAnon conspiracy theory but has since widened to discuss related conspiracy theories in general and the history of conspiratorial and reactionary thinking in other time periods.

QAA describes QAnon as a "big tent conspiracy theory" and a "meta conspiracy theory that provides an underlying narrative for other baseless theories". Annie Kelly acts as the podcast's United Kingdom correspondent and joined the podcast as the conspiracy theory spread from the United States to other countries, such as when it was accelerated by the COVID-19 pandemic.

Julian Feeld has told Wired that QAnon is "a colorful expression of a broader and more worrying global trend towards 'information warfare' in the service of those seeking to consolidate capital and power".

Travis View has written extensively for the Washington Post on the subject of QAnon. The podcast's hosts and correspondents, and View in particular, have been quoted and interviewed extensively by media covering the QAnon phenomenon, including Salon, Vice, BBC, Yahoo, the Atlantic Council, USA Today, and the Southern Poverty Law Center (SPLC).

The Washington Post named QAnon Anonymous as their Podcast of the Year for 2020.

References

External links 
 Official website
 QAnon Anonymous on Podchaser
 QAnon Anonymous on Apple Podcasts
 QAnon Anonymous on SoundCloud
 QAnon Anonymous on Twitter

Political podcasts
Investigative journalism
2018 podcast debuts 
Audio podcasts 
American podcasts
QAnon
Technology podcasts